The Leader of the Opposition in Tasmania is the title of the leader of the largest minority party in the state lower house, the Tasmanian House of Assembly. They act as the public face of the opposition, leads the opposition on the floor of parliament. They thus act as a chief critic of the government and ultimately attempt to portray the opposition as a feasible alternate government. They are also given certain additional rights under parliamentary standing orders, such as extended time limits for speeches. Should the opposition win an election, the Leader of the Opposition will usually be nominated to become the Premier of Tasmania.

The position of Leader of the Opposition was essentially informal throughout the nineteenth century, with formal recognition only being granted in the early twentieth century. As there was no party system until 1909, the loose ideological blocs in parliament tended to change regularly, and few people lasted in the position for more than one or two years at a time. The development of a party system gave the role greater significance, and it was subsequently given greater formal recognition, with an additional salary payment being accommodated for in 1927 and formal recognition in the parliamentary standing orders in 1937.

The current Leader of the Opposition is Rebecca White of the Labor Party. She has been in the role since 7 July 2021, having been elected to the leadership after David O'Byrne stood down from his role as leader. White had previously served as leader from 2017 to 2021, but had stood down after two election losses and to take maternity leave.

List of leaders of the opposition in Tasmania

External links
Leaders of the Opposition (Parliament of Tasmania)

Tasmania
 
Opposition